Frank Akoto (born 17 November 1997) is a Ghanaian professional footballer who plays as a defender for Ghanaian Premier League side Ashanti Gold.

Career 
Akoto started his career lower-tier side Fantomas FC. In 2012 he moved Kpando-based club Heart of Lions. He rose from the youth ranks to becoming captain of the senior side within the seven years of his stay with the club. He was rated as one of the best fullbacks in the Ghana Division One League for the seasons he spent in the league. In December 2019, he was signed by Obuasi-based club Ashanti Gold on a free transfer, signing a 3-year deal ahead of the 2019–20 Ghana Premier League. He became the last player to be signed by the Miners in the decade.

He made his debut on 9 February 2020 in a 1–0 win league match against Liberty Professionals. He was named on the starting line up and played 84 minutes of the match before being substituted for David Sandan Abagna, in process helping them keep a clean sheet.

International career 
Akoto has been capped at the U-23 level with Ghana national under-23 football team. He featured in matches for the side in 2019.

References

External links 

 
 

1997 births
Living people
Heart of Lions F.C. players
Ghanaian footballers
Association football defenders